Nantwich was a parliamentary constituency in Cheshire which returned one Member of Parliament (MP) to the House of Commons of the Parliament of the United Kingdom, elected using the first-past-the-post voting system.

History
Nantwich was created for the 1955 general election from parts of the Crewe and Northwich constituencies.

It was abolished following the reorganisation of local authorities in 1974 by the Third Periodic Review of Westminster constituencies for the 1983 general election, when it was divided between the re-established constituency of Eddisbury and the new constituencies of Crewe and Nantwich, and Congleton.

Boundaries
1955–1974: The Urban Districts of Middlewich, Nantwich, and Winsford, and parts of the Rural Districts of Nantwich, Northwich, and Tarvin.

The Urban District and the bulk of the Rural District of Nantwich were transferred from Crewe. Middlewich, Winsford, the southern part of the Rural District of Tarvin (including Malpas) and a small part of the Rural District of Northwich were transferred from Northwich.

1974–1983: As prior, with very minor changes to the boundaries.

From 1 April 1974 until the constituency was abolished at the next boundary review which came into effect for the 1983 general election, the constituency comprised parts of the expanded City of Chester and newly formed Boroughs of Crewe and Nantwich, and Vale Royal, but its boundaries were unchanged.

On abolition, Nantwich and surrounding rural areas were included in Crewe and Nantwich; Malpas and Winsford in Eddisbury; and Middlewich in Congleton.

Members of Parliament

Elections

Elections in the 1970s

Elections in the 1960s

Elections in the 1950s

See also

 History of parliamentary constituencies and boundaries in Cheshire

References

 Boundaries of Parliamentary Constituencies 1885-1972, compiled and edited by F. W. S. Craig (Political Reference Publications, 1972)

Parliamentary constituencies in North West England (historic)
Constituencies of the Parliament of the United Kingdom established in 1955
Constituencies of the Parliament of the United Kingdom disestablished in 1983
Nantwich